Cala Comte is a beach in the south west of the Spanish island of Ibiza.

Description
The beach of Cala Comte is a small sandy beach with several small coves near by. The beach has shallow clear blue and turquoise water which is kept that way by the constant flow of sea currents in the area. From the beach there are views of the small islands of S’Espartar Illa des Bosc and Sa Conillera. The beach to the western side of the rocky headland is popular with families, whilst the beach to the eastern side is an unofficial nudist spot.

Facilities 
Located on the crown of the small headland, there is a restaurant and shop along with toilet facilities. From the headland there are views across to several small islands. During the summer months the beach is patrolled by lifeguards. Behind the headland on the cliff tops there is a car park which becomes extremely busy in the summer.

Blue Flag
In 2010 Cala Conte was one of the fifteen beaches on the island to have been awarded a prestigious Blue Flag.

Location 
The beach is in the municipality of Sant Josep de sa Talaia but the nearest large island resort is Sant Antoni. To get to the beach from Sant Antoni there are several options. It is a well signposted drive with brown tourist signs from the PM 803 road at the nearby village of Sant Agustí des Vedrà. There is also a frequent bus service in the summer from both Sant Antoni and Ibiza town.
There are also regular ferry boat departures  regularly San Antonio harbour and various hotels along the Sant Antoni Bay during the summer months to the beach.

Gallery

References

Beaches of Ibiza
Beaches of the Balearic Islands